Ethnic groups in South Africa by municipality details the ethnic composition of South Africa by municipality, according to the 2011 census.

See also
 Demographics of South Africa

References

Ethnic groups
 
Ethnic groups